The Sylvester graph is the unique distance-regular graph
with intersection array .
It is a subgraph of the Hoffman–Singleton graph.

References

External links
  A.E. Brouwer's website: the Sylvester graph

Individual graphs
Regular graphs